Jimmy D. Lampley (born July 2, 1960) is a retired professional basketball center who played one season in the National Basketball Association (NBA) as a member of the Philadelphia 76ers during the 1986–87 season. Born in Harrisburg, Pennsylvania, he attended Vanderbilt University and the University of Arkansas at Little Rock where he was drafted in the fifth round of the 1983 NBA draft by the Dallas Mavericks, who he never played for. Lampley signed with three teams who he never appeared in a game for: the Dallas Mavericks, the Washington Bullets and the Milwaukee Bucks.

While his NBA career was brief, he had a long and successful career in the Continental Basketball Association (CBA). He played 314 games over eight seasons and for seven teams. Averaging 13.8 points and 8.9 rebounds, he was named to the all-league team for the 1988–89 season and appeared in two All-Star games.

References

External links

1960 births
Living people
American expatriate basketball people in Argentina
American expatriate basketball people in Belgium
American expatriate basketball people in Canada
American expatriate basketball people in Mexico
American men's basketball players
Baltimore Lightning players
Basketball players from Harrisburg, Pennsylvania
Centers (basketball)
Columbus Horizon players
Detroit Spirits players
Little Rock Trojans men's basketball players
Pensacola Tornados (1986–1991) players
Philadelphia 76ers players
Quad City Thunder players
Rockford Lightning players
Sioux Falls Skyforce (CBA) players
Tulsa Fast Breakers players
Vanderbilt Commodores men's basketball players